Jujubinus is a genus of sea snails, marine gastropod mollusks in the family Trochidae, the top snails.

The species of Jujubinus are close in appearance to Cantharidus Montfort, 1810, and differ only in their more angular body whorl and a narrower spire angle.

Species
Species within the genus Jujubinus include:

 † Jujubinus ajachaensis Martín-González & Vera-Peláez, 2018 
 Jujubinus alboranensis Smriglio, Mariottini & Oliverio, 2015
 † Jujubinus altavillae Giannuzzi-Savelli & Reina, 1987
 † Jujubinus angustus (Deshayes, 1832) 
 † Jujubinus annamarieae Landau, Marquet & Grigis, 2003 
 † Jujubinus armatus Ceulemans, Van Dingenen & Landau, 2016 
 † Jujubinus astraeaformis Brunetti & Della Bella, 2006 
 Jujubinus augustoi Rolan & Gori, 2009
 Jujubinus baudoni (Monterosato, 1891)
 Jujubinus browningleeae Smriglio, Mariottini & Swinnen, 2018
 † Jujubinus bucklandi (Cossmann & Peyrot, 1917) 
 † Jujubinus bullula (P. Fischer, 1877) 
 † Jujubinus burdigalicus (Cossmann & Peyrot, 1917) 
 † Jujubinus catenatus Ardovini, 2006
 † Jujubinus celinae (Andrzejowski, 1833) 
 † Jujubinus chatticus Janssen, 1978 
 † Jujubinus condevicnumensis Ceulemans, Van Dingenen & Landau, 2016 
 † Jujubinus coronatus Landau, Van Dingenen & Ceulemans, 2017 
 Jujubinus curinii Bogi & Campani, 2005
 † Jujubinus demersus (Kranz, 1910) 
 † Jujubinus deshayesi (Mayer, 1862) 
 Jujubinus dispar Curini-Galletti, 1982
 † Jujubinus ditropis (Wood, 1848) 
 Jujubinus eleonorae Smriglio, Di Giulio & Mariottini, 2014
 Jujubinus errinae Smriglio, Mariottini & Giacobbe, 2016 
 Jujubinus escondidus Poppe, Tagaro & Dekker, 2006
 Jujubinus exasperatus (Pennant, 1777)
 † Jujubinus fossorensis Lozouet, 1999 
 Jujubinus fraterculus (Monterosato, 1880)
 Jujubinus fulgor Gofas, 1991
 † Jujubinus gaasensis (Cossmann & Peyrot, 1917) 
 Jujubinus geographicus Poppe, Tagaro & Dekker, 2006
 Jujubinus gilberti (Montrouzier, 1878)
 Jujubinus gravinae (Dautzenberg, 1881)
 Jujubinus guanchus Curini-Galletti, 1985
 Jujubinus guphili Poppe, Tagaro & Dekker, 2006
 † Jujubinus gymnospirus (Cossmann & Peyrot, 1917) 
 † Jujubinus hannonicus (Rutot in Cossmann, 1915) 
 † Jujubinus helenae Pacaud, 2017 
 Jujubinus hernandezi Rolan & Swinnen, 2009
 † Jujubinus hoernesianus (Sacco, 1896) 
 Jujubinus hubrechti Poppe, Tagaro & Dekker, 2006
 † Jujubinus infraoligocaenicus (Cossmann & Lambert, 1884) †
 Jujubinus interruptus (Wood, 1828) 
 Jujubinus karpathoensis Nordsieck, 1973
 † Jujubinus kostejanus (Boettger, 1907) 
 † Jujubinus lamarckii (Deshayes, 1832) 
 † Jujubinus lamberti (Cossmann, 1892) 
 † Jujubinus lawleyi (De Stefani & Pantanelli, 1888) 
 † Jujubinus ligeriensis Ceulemans, Van Dingenen & Landau, 2016 
 Jujubinus mabelae Rolan & Swinnen, 2009
 Jujubinus maldivensis (E. A. Smith, 1903)
 † Jujubinus mimus (Eichwald, 1850) 
 Jujubinus montagui (Wood, 1828)
 † Jujubinus pigeonblancensis Ceulemans, Van Dingenen & Landau, 2016 
 † Jujubinus planatus (Friedberg, 1928) 
 Jujubinus polychroma (A. Adams, 1853) 
 Jujubinus poppei Curini-Galletti, 1985
 † Jujubinus proximus (Millet, 1865) 
 Jujubinus pseudogravinae Nordsieck, 1973
 † Jujubinus pseudoturricula (Dollfus & Dautzenberg, 1886) 
 † Jujubinus puber (Eichwald, 1850) 
 † Jujubinus punctulatus (Dujardin, 1837) 
 † Jujubinus quadrangulus (Briart & Cornet, 1887) 
 † Jujubinus quantulus Lozouet, 1999 
 Jujubinus rafaemesai Rolán & Swinnen, 2013
 † Jujubinus redoniensis Landau, Van Dingenen & Ceulemans, 2017 
 † Jujubinus rhenanus (Braun in Walchner, 1851) 
 Jujubinus rubioi Rolan & Templado, 2001
 Jujubinus ruscurianus (Weinkauff, 1868)
 † Jujubinus sceauxensis Landau, Van Dingenen & Ceulemans, 2017 
 † Jujubinus sexangularis (Sandberger, 1859) 
 Jujubinus silbogomerus Smriglio, Mariottini & Swinnen, 2019
 † Jujubinus silveri Welle, 2009 
 Jujubinus striatus (Linnaeus, 1758)
 Jujubinus suarezensis (P. Fischer, 1878) 
 † Jujubinus subcarinatus (Lamarck, 1804) 
 † Jujubinus subfragilis (d'Orbigny, 1850) 
 † Jujubinus subincrassatus (d'Orbigny, 1852) 
 † Jujubinus subreticulatus (Boettger, 1907) 
 † Jujubinus subtilistriatus (Cossmann & Peyrot, 1917) 
 † Jujubinus subturgidulus (d'Orbigny, 1850) 
 Jujubinus tingitanus (Pallary, 1902)
 Jujubinus trilloi Smriglio, Di Giulio & Mariottini, 2014
 † Jujubinus trochlearis (Sandberger, 1859) 
 Jujubinus tumidulus (Aradas, 1846)
 † Jujubinus turgidulus (Brocchi, 1814) 
 † Jujubinus turricula (Eichwald, 1830) 
 Jujubinus unidentatus (Philippi, 1844)
 † Jujubinus vexans (Boettger, 1907) 
 Jujubinus vexationis Curini-Galletti, 1990
 † Jujubinus zukowcensis (Andrzejowski, 1833) 

Species brought into synonymy 
 Jujubinus (Jujubinus) Monterosato, 1884: alternate representation of Jujubinus
 Jujubinus (Mirulinus) Monterosato, 1917: alternate representation of Jujubinus
 Jujubinus (Clelandella): synonym of Clelandella Winckworth, 1932
 Jujubinus aegeensis Nordsieck, 1973: synonym of Jujubinus karpathoensis Nordsieck, 1973
 Jujubinus aequistriatus Monterosato, 1884: synonym of Jujubinus striatus (Linnaeus, 1758)
 Jujubinus africanus Nordsieck, 1973: synonym of Jujubinus unidentatus (Philippi, 1844)
 Jujubinus altior Coen, 1937: synonym of Jujubinus striatus (Linnaeus, 1758)
 Jujubinus aureus Monterosato, 1890: synonym of Clelandella miliaris (Brocchi, 1814)
 Jujubinus baudouini [sic]: synonym of Jujubinus baudoni (Monterosato, 1891)
 Jujubinus brugnonei Coen, 1937: synonym of Jujubinus striatus (Linnaeus, 1758)
 Jujubinus clelandi (Wood, 1828): synonym of Clelandella miliaris (Brocchi, 1814)
 Jujubinus corallinus Monterosato, 1884: synonym of Jujubinus exasperatus (Pennant, 1777)
 Jujubinus crenelliferus (A. Adams, 1853): synonym of Cantharidus crenelliferus (A. Adams, 1853)
 Jujubinus decipiens Parenzan, 1970: synonym of Jujubinus striatus (Linnaeus, 1758)
 Jujubinus defiorei Coen, 1937: synonym of Jujubinus striatus (Linnaeus, 1758)
 Jujubinus delpreteanus Sulliotti, 1889: synonym of Jujubinus striatus (Linnaeus, 1758)
 Jujubinus elenchoides (Issel, 1878): synonym of Jujubinus striatus (Linnaeus, 1758)
 Jujubinus fulguratus Pallary, 1906: synonym of Jujubinus unidentatus (Philippi, 1844)
 Jujubinus gilberti (Montrouzier in Fischer, 1878): synonym of Cantharidus polychroma (A. Adams, 1853) 
 Jujubinus goniobasis Coen, 1937: synonym of Jujubinus striatus (Linnaeus, 1758)
 Jujubinus igneus Sturany, 1896: synonym of Jujubinus exasperatus (Pennant, 1777)
 Jujubinus istrianus Coen, 1933: synonym of Jujubinus exasperatus (Pennant, 1777)
 Jujubinus kochi Nordsieck, 1973: synonym of Jujubinus ruscurianus (Weinkauff, 1868)
 Jujubinus lepidus (Philippi, 1846): synonym of Strigosella lepida (Philippi, 1846)
 Jujubinus magnificus Coen, 1937: synonym of Jujubinus striatus (Linnaeus, 1758)
 Jujubinus miliaris (Brocchi, 1814): synonym of Clelandella miliaris (Brocchi, 1814)
 Jujubinus mixtus Ghisotti & Melone, 1975: synonym of Jujubinus exasperatus (Pennant, 1777)
 Jujubinus montagui mediterraneus Coen, G.S: synonym of Jujubinus montagui (Wood, W., 1828)	
 Jujubinus multistriatus Ghisotti & Melone, 1975: synonym of Jujubinus striatus (Linnaeus, 1758)
 Jujubinus obscurus Thiele, J., 1930: synonym of Cantharidus polychroma (Adams, A., 1853)
 Jujubinus orientalis Nordsieck, F: synonym of Jujubinus elenchoides (Issel, A., 1878); synonym of Jujubinus striatus (Linnaeus, 1758)		
 Jujubinus parvosiculus Ghisotti & Melone, 1975: synonym of Jujubinus gravinae (Dautzenberg, 1881)
 Jujubinus parvulus Brusina, S.: synonym of Jujubinus striatus (Linnaeus, 1758)
 Jujubinus parvulus Philippi, R.A: synonym of Jujubinus montagui (Wood, W., 1828)
 Jujubinus propinquis Monterosato, T.A. de M. di: synonym of Jujubinus striatus (Linnaeus, 1758)
 Jujubinus propinquus Ghisotti & Melone, 1975: synonym of Jujubinus striatus (Linnaeus, 1758)
 Jujubinus smaragdinus (Monterosato, 1880): synonym of Jujubinus striatus (Linnaeus, 1758)
 Jujubinus suturalis (A. Adams, 1853): synonym of Prothalotia suturalis (A. Adams, 1853)

References

 Smriglio, Mariottini & Oliverio, 2015, Description of two new Jujubinus  species (Gastropoda: Trochidae) from theSicily Channel, with notes on the  Jujubinus curinii species complex; Zootaxa  3815 (4): 583-590

External links
 Monterosato T. A. (di) (1883-1885). Conchiglie littorali mediterranee. Naturalista Siciliano, Palermo, 3(3): 87-91 (1883); 3(4): 102-111; 3(5): 137-140; 3(6): 159-163; 3(8): 227-231; 3(10): 277-281; 4(1-2): 21-25; 4(3): 60-63 (1884); 4(4): 80-84; 4(8): 200-204 (1885)
 Monterosato T. A. (di) (1884). Nomenclatura generica e specifica di alcune conchiglie mediterranee. Palermo, Virzi, 152 pp.
 Crosse H. (1885). Nomenclatura generica e specifica di alcune conchiglie mediterranee, pel Marchese di Monterosato [book review]. Journal de Conchyliologie 33: 139-142
 Gofas, S.; Le Renard, J.; Bouchet, P. (2001). Mollusca, in: Costello, M.J. et al. (Ed.) (2001). European register of marine species: a check-list of the marine species in Europe and a bibliography of guides to their identification. Collection Patrimoines Naturels, 50: pp. 180–213
 Herbert D.G. (2015). An annotated catalogue and bibliography of the taxonomy, synonymy and distribution of the Recent Vetigastropoda of South Africa (Mollusca). Zootaxa. 4049(1): 1-98

 
Trochidae
Gastropod genera